The men's 1500 metres event at the 2003 Asian Athletics Championships was held in Manila, Philippines on September 20–21.

Medalists

Results

Heats

Final

References

2003 Asian Athletics Championships
1500 metres at the Asian Athletics Championships